Operation Geronimo may refer to:

 Operation Neptune Spear, the May 2011 operation that resulted in the death of Osama bin Laden in Abbottabad, Pakistan
 Operation Geronimo name controversy, concerning the use of "Geronimo" in the hunt for Osama bin Laden
 Operation Geronimo Strike
 Operation Geronimo Strike I, the 2007 counterinsurgency operation in Kalsu's Fish Farms, Iraq
 Operation Geronimo Strike II, the 2007 counterinsurgency operation in Iraq
 Operation Geronimo Strike III, the 2007 strike against Al-Qaeda in Iraq, northwest of Iskandariyah, Iraq
 Task Force 1 Geronimo, the 2009–2010 operation of 501st Infantry Regiment (United States) in Afghanistan, during Operation Enduring Freedom
 Operation Geronimo (Vietnam), a 101st Airborne Division search operation
 The military expedition to capture or kill Chief Geronimo, during the Indian Wars, see Geronimo